Phil Karn is a retired American soccer player who played professionally in the USL A-League.

In 1994, Karn graduated from Abington High School.  In 1994, Karn began his collegiate career at Drexel University.  He transferred to Penn State University in 1996.  In 1998, Karn turned professional with Reading Rage of the USISL D-3 Pro League, earning Second Team All League.  His fourteen goals that season led to his moving up to the Pittsburgh Riverhounds of the USL A-League.  Karn spent four seasons with the Riverhounds, then returned to Reading for the 2003 season.  In February 2001, the Columbus Crew selected Karn in the sixth round (63rd overall), but was released on March 19, 2001.

He is the assistant youth director for the Philadelphia Union.

He is a third cousin of Phil Karn, the electrical and computer engineer.

References

Living people
1975 births
American soccer players
Columbus Crew draft picks
Drexel Dragons men's soccer players
Penn State Nittany Lions men's soccer players
Pittsburgh Riverhounds SC players
Reading United A.C. players
A-League (1995–2004) players
USL Second Division players
Soccer players from Pennsylvania
Philadelphia Union non-playing staff
Association football midfielders
Association football forwards